The 2013 Nature's Way Sydney Tennis International was a professional tennis tournament played on hard courts. It was the first edition of the tournament which was part of the 2013 ATP Challenger Tour and the 2013 ITF Women's Circuit. It took place in Sydney, Australia, between 25 February and 3 March 2013.

ATP singles main-draw entrants

Seeds

1 Rankings as of 18 February 2013

Other entrants
The following players received wildcards into the singles main draw:
  Jay Andrijic
  Nick Kyrgios
  Jordan Thompson
  Bradley Mousley

The following players received entry from the qualifying draw:
  Colin Ebelthite
  Nicholas Horton
  Artem Sitak
  Michael Venus

ATP doubles main-draw entrants

Seeds

1 Rankings as of 24 December 2013

Other entrants
The following pairs received wildcards into the doubles main draw:
  Jay Andrijic /  Sadik Kadir
  Jacob Grills /  Bradley Mousley
  Jack Schipanski /  Jordan Thompson

The following pairs received entry as alternates:
  Ryan Agar /  Sebastian Bader

Champions

Men's singles

  Nick Kyrgios def.  Matt Reid 6–3, 6–2

Men's doubles

  Brydan Klein /  Dane Propoggia def.  Alex Bolt /  Nick Kyrgios 6–4, 4–6, [11–9]

Women's singles

  Wang Yafan def.  Misa Eguchi 6–2, 6–0

Women's doubles

  Misa Eguchi /  Mari Tanaka def.  Tamara Čurović /  Wang Yafan 4–6, 7–5, [10–8]

 
2013 ATP Challenger Tour
2013 ITF Women's Circuit
2013
2013 in Australian tennis